Tom Loback (1949 – 5 March 2015) was an artist, known for his illustrations of characters from J. R. R. Tolkien's 1977 book The Silmarillion, his miniature figurines, and his public artworks in New York. He contributed also as a Tolkien scholar interested in Tolkien's constructed languages.

Biography 

Tom Loback was born in 1949. As well as his Middle-earth work and his driftwood sculptures, he also created figurines of characters from the American Civil War and from fantasy works. Loback died of the after-effects of the September 11 attacks.

Driftwood sculptures 

His best-known public artworks were sculptures made from driftwood and exhibited on the Hudson River in Manhattan, New York; those works were anonymous and his identity appeared mysterious, though it was never secret. Loback collected the materials from the Hudson River itself; when a woman scolded him for "ruining the city's 'pristine' nature", he replied that the shoreline was composed of railroad landfill. He created some thousands of driftwood sculptures, taking around half an hour to create each one.

Tolkien's Middle-earth 

Loback contributed to the appreciation of J. R. R. Tolkien's legendarium in two ways: through his art, and with scholarly study. The Tolkien scholar Bradford Lee Eden commented that Loback's work was "unique" both in featuring Tolkien's scripts (Cirth and Tengwar) and Elvish languages (both Quenya and Sindarin) in his art, and in his imitation of the style of medieval illuminated manuscripts. His artistic vision of The Silmarillion has been celebrated alongside that of other Tolkien illustrators: in 1990, Mythlore set Loback and three others the task of illustrating the confrontation between the maker of the Silmarils, Fëanor, and his half-brother Fingolfin. 

The linguist and computer scientist Carl F. Hostetter wrote that Loback's contribution to Tolkien linguistics was in its nomenclature. Loback wrote on Middle-earth subjects for magazines including Beyond Bree and Little Gwaihir, and the linguistic journals Vinyar Tengwar and Parma Eldalamberon.

Works

Books 

 Halls of the Elven-King (Fortresses of Middle-earth). Charlottesville: Iron Crown Enterprises, 1988 (ISBN 978-1-5580-6015-9)

Scholarly articles 

 "The Kindreds, Houses, and Population of the Elves during the First Age" (Mythlore 14.1, 1987)
 "Orc Hosts, Armies and Legions: A Demographic Study" (Mythlore 16.4, 1990)
 "To -E or -NE? On the Quenya Past Tense" (Parma Eldalamberon 9, 1990)

Artworks 

A selection of Loback's The Silmarillion artworks, which he uploaded to Commons, is shown here.

References

External links 

 Descriptions of Loback's works at the Elvish Linguistic Fellowship, with transcriptions and translations of the Tengwar scripts in his artworks
 Bibliography of Loback's contributions (illustrations and essays) to Beyond Bree
 Loback's "Eärendil" back cover art for Mythlore 57
 Loback's last artwork and In memoriam on Elendilion.pl

Tolkien studies
2015 deaths
1949 births